State Route 128 (SR 128) is a Washington state highway located in Asotin and Whitman counties, west of the Idaho state line. The highway was originally created in 1964 on a Pomeroy–Clarkston route, replacing  (SSH 3K), which had been established in 1937; in 1991, the route was changed to its present form.

Route description

SR 128 after the US 12 intersection was used by 5,000 motorists daily in 2007 based on average annual daily traffic (AADT) data collected by the Washington State Department of Transportation.

History

The first highway that would later become SR 128 was Secondary State Highway 3K (SSH 3K), which was first designated in 1937.

In 1990, the state legislature approved an extension of SR 128 across the Red Wolf Crossing (replacing a section of SR 193) and east to the Idaho state line. The extension was in response to the state of Idaho designating Idaho State Highway 128 on the other side of the border.

Major intersections

References

External links
Highways of Washington State

128
Transportation in Asotin County, Washington
Transportation in Whitman County, Washington